The Battle of Elkin's Ferry (April 3 – 4, 1864), also known as Engagement at Elkin's Ferry, was fought in Clark and Nevada counties in Arkansas as part of the Camden Expedition, during the American Civil War.

Prelude
Major-General Frederick Steele had the 3rd Division of the Seventh Army Corps and two cavalry brigades (about 8,500 men) under his command, whereas Brigadier-General John Marmaduke had three cavalry brigades (about 7,500 men) under his command. During the Camden expedition, Federal forces had to ford the Little Missouri River because all of the bridges were impassable.

Battle

With all the bridges across the river destroyed, Steele ordered Brigadier-General Frederick Salomon, commanding the Third Division, to take and hold a ford known as Elkin's Ferry on the afternoon of April 2, 1864.  The 43rd Indiana was tasked with this objective, supported by elements of the 36th Iowa Infantry and the 2nd Missouri Light Artillery.  Following a forced march, the 43rd arrived at the crossing after dark that evening, crossed the river, and set up defensive positions while awaiting the rest of Steele's army.

Opposing the Federal advance was a division of three cavalry brigades under Marmaduke—about 7500 troopers altogether.  Marmaduke ordered Brigadier-General Joseph Shelby to attack the 43rd and take back the ford.  Federal Colonel William McLean states what happened next:

Aftermath
Losses on both sides in the Battle of Elkin's Ferry were light, with 18 Confederate soldiers killed and 50 wounded, and with 30 Union soldiers wounded. On the evening of April 4, Shelby's brigade joined Marmaduke, and together they withdrew 16 miles south to Prairie D'Ane the following morning.

Battlefield preservation
The Civil War Trust, a division of the American Battlefield Trust, and its partners have acquired and preserved 442 acres at the Elkin's Ferry Battlefield.

See also

 List of American Civil War battles

Notes

References
 McLean, William E., Forty-Third Regiment Indiana Volunteers: An Historic Sketch of Its Career and Services (Terre Haute, C.W. Brown, 1903)

Further reading

External links
 Battle of Elkin’s Ferry at the American Battlefield Protection Program
 Battle of Elkin’s Ferry at Encyclopedia of Arkansas History & Culture
 History of the American War, Volume 3, Henry Charles Fletcher, R. Bentley, 1866

1864 in Arkansas
April 1864 events
Battle of Elkin's Ferry
Battles of the American Civil War in Arkansas
Battles of the Trans-Mississippi Theater of the American Civil War
Camden Expedition
Conflicts in 1864
Battle of Elkin's Ferry
Battle of Elkin's Ferry
Union victories of the American Civil War
Little Missouri River (Arkansas)